The 1996 Danamon Open was a women's tennis tournament played on outdoor hard courts at the Gelora Senayan Stadium in Jakarta in Indonesia and was part of Tier III of the 1996 WTA Tour. It was the fourth edition of the tournament and ran from 9 April through 14 April 1996. Fifth-seeded Linda Wild won the singles title.

Finals

Singles

 Linda Wild defeated  Yayuk Basuki by walkover
 It was Wild's only singles title of the year and the 5th and last of her career.

Doubles

 Rika Hiraki /  Naoko Kijimuta defeated  Laurence Courtois /  Nancy Feber 7–6(7–2), 7–5
 It was Hiraki's only title of the year and the 3rd of her career. It was Kijimuta's 1st title of the year and the 1st of her career.

References

External links
 ITF tournament edition details
 Tournament draws

Danamon Open
Danamon Open
Danamon Open
Danamon Open